= Ricardo Viegas D'Abreu =

Angolan politician

- Born: Angola
- Occupation: Politician

Ricardo Viegas D'Abreu is an Angolan politician. He is the current Minister of Transport of Angola, as well as a member of parliament. He is a member of MPLA.
